Claus Victor Bock (7 May 1926 – 5 January 2008) was a professor of German studies.

In the early 1950s, Bock studied with Ronald Peacock at the University of Manchester, attracted by the latter's research on Hölderlin, and obtained a PhD at Basle under Walter Muschg. After working briefly as an assistant lecturer at his alma mater, he became a lecturer at Queen Mary College, London (1958), then reader (1964), and finally professor of German, Westfield College, London (1969). Two of Bock's noted PhD students were Jeremy Adler and John Fletcher.

Further reading 
 

Academics of Queen Mary University of London
Academics of Westfield College
Alumni of the Victoria University of Manchester
1926 births
2008 deaths
Officers Crosses of the Order of Merit of the Federal Republic of Germany